Shihori (also Shihori) is a village in Banaskantha district of the Indian state of Gujarat. It is the administrative headquarters of the Kankrej Taluka and has a population of more than 10,000.

Transport
Rail
Shihori Railway Station near Umbari village Patan-Bhildi line. The Sihori railway station connect to Bhildi, Patan, Rajasthan, Machilipatnam, and Jaswantpura.

Airport
The nearest airport is Jaipur International Airport, approximately 76.6 km (47.6 miles) away.

Road
National Highway 14 passes through Sihori, connecting it to cities including Ahmedabad, Palanpur, Patan and Radhanpur.

Sihori has 300+ buses linking to various parts of Gujarat.

Climate
Summers are hot and humid with an average temperature of 40 C, with hot sandy winds. Winters are mild with temperatures between five and fifteen degrees. In the monsoon season rainfall is between 38 and 76 cm.

Temples

Sihori has several temples:
Jogni Mata Mandir
Bahuchar Mata Mandir
Ramji Mandir
Hanuman Duga Vada Mandir
Mahamandleswar Mahadev
Gau Mata Mandir (Temple of Cow)
Jain Adinath Mandir

Education
Sihori has two primary education government schools. A high school is named M.V. Valani High School. A private school is named Sarvottam School of Education.

Economy
Sihori has branches of the State Bank of India, Dena Bank, Bank of Baroda, Banas Bank, Nagrik Bank, and Dena Gujarat Gramin Bank. The currency used is the Indian rupee (INR)

Sihori has milk cooperative societies and cold storage facilities.

References

External links
 Information about Banaskantha which also includes Sihori

Cities and towns in Banaskantha district

bpy:থারাদ